The R631 road is a short regional road in County Cork, Ireland. It travels from the R630 road at Whitewell Cross, Crochane, eastwards into the crossroads at Rock Street, Cloyne.

References

Regional roads in the Republic of Ireland
Roads in County Cork